The 1948–49 season was the 41st year of football played by Dundee United, and covers the period from 1 July 1948 to 30 June 1949. United finished in eighth place in the Second Division.

Match results
Dundee United played a total of 39 competitive matches during the 1948–49 season.

Legend

All results are written with Dundee United's score first.
Own goals in italics

Division B

Scottish Cup

League Cup

Supplementary Cup

See also
 1948–49 in Scottish football

References

Dundee United F.C. seasons
Dundee United